The Academy of the New Church, Secondary Schools is an accredited, private, day and boarding, 9th through 12th-grade Girls School and Boys School, located in Bryn Athyn, Pennsylvania, United States. The school is affiliated with the General Church of New Jerusalem's educational arm, the Academy of the New Church, along with the Bryn Athyn College of the New Church, the Academy of the New Church Theological School and others. It was established in 1876.

History
Its primary goal was to prepare men for the priesthood of the New Church. Following the establishment of the Theological School and a collegiate department, later to become Bryn Athyn College, the Boys School opened in 1881. In 1884, a girls' school, privately set up by Sarah DeCharms Hibbard, merged with the Academy.

At the start of the 20th century, the schools relocated to what was then the countryside near Philadelphia, in Montgomery County. Funding from PPG Industries founder John Pitcairn enabled the construction of the new campus. Later, in the 1960s, the college moved to a separate, adjacent campus.

Notable alumni 

 Rakeem Christmas – Power forward (basketball) at Syracuse University and Indiana Pacers
 John Rienstra - Guard (American football) at Pittsburgh Steelers (1986-1990) and Cleveland Browns (1991-1992)
 Marcus Gilbert - Small forward at Fairfield University
 Hugo Salinas Price - Mexican businessperson

References

External links

Christian schools in Pennsylvania
Private high schools in Pennsylvania
Educational institutions established in 1876
Schools in Montgomery County, Pennsylvania
1876 establishments in Pennsylvania
Bryn Athyn, Pennsylvania
General Church of the New Jerusalem
Boarding schools in Pennsylvania